The 2019 Super League XXIV season was the 24th season of Super League, and 125th season of rugby league in Great Britain. The Super League XXIV commenced on 31 January 2019, and ended on 12 October 2019. It consisted of 29 regular season games, and 4 rounds of play-offs, which included the Grand Final at Old Trafford.  The fixture list was released on 6 November 2018.

Fixtures And Results

Round 1

Round 2

Round 3

Round 4

Round 5

Round 6

Round 7

Round 8

Round 9

Round 10

Round 11
(Maundy Thursday / Good Friday)

Round 12
(Easter Monday)

Round 13

Round 14

Round 15

Round 16
(Magic Weekend)

Round 17

Round 18

Fixtures/times may change

Round 19

Fixtures/times may change

Round 20

Fixtures/times may change

Round 21

Fixtures/times may change

Round 22

Round 23

Round 24

Round 25

Round 26

Fixtures/times may change

Round 27

Round 28

Fixtures/Times may change

Round 29

Playoffs

Week 1: Elimination and qualifying finals

Week 2: Semi-finals

Week 3: Preliminary final

Week 4: Grand final

References

Super League XXIV